The Lebanese Second Division is the second division of Lebanese football. Established in 1933, it is controlled by the Lebanese Football Association. The 12 teams that participate in the league play each other twice, once at home and once away, with the champions and the second placed team qualifying to the Lebanese Premier League to replace the bottom two teams.

History
Salam Achrafieh won the inaugural edition of the Second Division, in 1933–34, after beating Ararad 2–0 in the final. There was no promotion or relegation system at the time, so Salam Achrafieh remained in the Second Division. In April 1935, Second Division clubs requested a promotion system to be implemented. It was proposed that, at the end of the season, every Second Division team that wanted to be promoted to the First Division had to play against three teams from the First Division, one match each, winning all three. The teams from the First Division had to have at least seven players from their previous season's squad.

Clubs

Champions

The following is a list of Lebanese Second Division champions.

2020–21 season
The following 12 clubs are competing in the Lebanese Second Division during the current 2021–22 season.

Media coverage
In 2019, Mycujoo stream a selection of Lebanese Second Division games weekly. In October 2022, the LFA and FIFA signed an agreement to broadcast all matches in the Lebanese Second Division, Lebanese Super Cup and Lebanese Women's Football League through the FIFA+ platform, and some Lebanese Premier League games.

Notes

References

Bibliography

External links
 Lebanese Second Division at Goalzz.com

 
2
Sports leagues established in 1933
1933 establishments in Lebanon
Second level football leagues in Asia